The Basketbol Süper Ligi Mr. King, is the season scoring leader of the Turkish top-tier level professional club basketball league, the Türkiye Basketbol Süper Ligi (BSL) (English: Turkish Basketball Super League). In basketball, points are the sum of the score accumulated through free throws or field goals. The LNB Pro A's scoring title is awarded to the player with the highest points per game average in a given regular season. Prior to the 1993–94 season, the league's Top Scorer was the player that scored the most total points in the league during the season. Since the 1993–94 season, the league's Top Scorer is the player with the highest scoring average per game during the season.

Scoring leaders by total points scored (1966–67 to 1992–93)

Scoring leaders by points per game (1993–94 to present)

See also
Basketbol Süper Ligi Finals MVP

References

External links 
  Turkish Basketball Super League official website
  Turkish Basketball Federation official website

Turkish Basketball Super League statistical leaders